Swarna Jayanti express trains are weekly Superfast trains introduced in 1997 for the 50th "Golden Jubilee" year of India's independence. All trains go to Delhi, via multiple routes such as:

 Mysore Swarna Jayanti Express
 Jharkhand Swarna Jayanti Express
 Jharkhand Swarna Jayanti Express (via Barkakana)
 Trivandrum Swarna Jayanti Express (via Kollam Junction, Ernakulam)
 Visakhapatnam Swarna Jayanti Express
 Sambalpur as Hirakud Swarna Jayanti Express, later shortened to Hirakud Express, is also introduced as part of the Swarna Jayanti Express series. Under the political pressure the train extended farther to Bhubaneswar and later to Visakhapatnam and Amritsar.
 Ahmedabad Swarna Jayanti Rajdhani Express is also part of the Swarna Jayanti Express series. This is the only Swarna Jayanti with fully air conditioned coaches along with Rajdhani status.
 Millennium Express to Ernakulam is part of this series.

Livery

Back in the days of maroon-colored coaches and vacuum-braked stock, Mysore and Visakhapatnam Swarna Jayanti Expresses ran with a red, white, and blue livery, until all coaches were made back into the air-braked blue coaches.

Railway services introduced in 1997
Named passenger trains of India